West Brighton, or West New Brighton, is a neighborhood in Staten Island, New York City

West Brighton may also refer to:

 West New Brighton station, serving the Staten Island neighborhood
 A former name for Hove railway station, Sussex, England